Allal Benkassou (11 November 1941 – 29 October 2013 in Rabat) was a Moroccan footballer who played as a goalkeeper.

Ben-Kassou played club football for FAR Rabat.

Benkassou played for the Morocco national team at the 1964 Summer Olympics where he played against Yugoslavia and Hungary and at the 1970 FIFA World Cup finals where he played against West Germany and Peru. He was an unused squad member at the 1972 Summer Olympics. He played 116 times for the Morocco football team.

In 2006, he was selected by CAF as one of the best 200 African football players of the last 50 years.

Also, Benkassou was a sergeant of the Moroccan Army.

References

External links 
 
 
 

1941 births
2013 deaths
Moroccan footballers
Footballers from Rabat
Association football goalkeepers
Morocco international footballers
1970 FIFA World Cup players
1972 African Cup of Nations players
Footballers at the 1964 Summer Olympics
Footballers at the 1972 Summer Olympics
Olympic footballers of Morocco
Competitors at the 1963 Mediterranean Games
Competitors at the 1967 Mediterranean Games
Competitors at the 1971 Mediterranean Games
Mediterranean Games competitors for Morocco
Botola players
AS FAR (football) players
20th-century Moroccan people